This is a list of mayors of the Pittsburgh suburb and "twin city" of Allegheny, Pennsylvania which was annexed by Pittsburgh in 1907 and is currently the North Side of the city.

Burgesses of the Borough of Allegheny
John Irwin 1829-34 
Hugh Davis 1835-38 
John Morrison 1839-40

Mayors of the City of Allegheny
Mayoral terms were for one year until 1868, two years from 1868-1872, and three years from 1872 on.

External links
List of Mayors

History of Pittsburgh
Allegheny